Ladislau "Gioni" Brosovszky (23 March 1951 – 23 December 1990) was a Romanian football midfielder with Hungarian roots.  He was part of UTA's team that in the 1970–1971 European Cup season eliminated Feyenoord who were European champions at that time. His daughter, Monica Brosovszky-Boriga is a former basketball player who played 270 games for the Romania women's national basketball team and won the Liga Națională 6 times with BC ICIM Arad and CSM Târgoviște.

Honours

Club
UTA Arad
Liga I: 1968–69, 1969–70

Career statistics
Total matches played in Romanian First League: 314 matches – 100 goals
Topscorer of UTA Arad in Romanian First League: 100 goals.
European Cups: 16 matches – 4 goals
Romania U 23: 13 matches – 1 goals

Notes

References

External links

1951 births
1990 deaths
Sportspeople from Arad, Romania
Romanian footballers
Olympic footballers of Romania
Romania international footballers
Liga I players
Liga II players
FC UTA Arad players
Vagonul Arad players
Association football midfielders